NOB may refer to:

National Orchestra of Belgium
Newell's Old Boys, a professional football club in Rosario, Argentina
Nederlandse Onderwatersport Bond (Dutch Underwater Federation), the Netherlands skin-diving association 
Estrada de Ferro Nor Oeste do Brasil, former railway company in Brazil (see Rail transport in Brazil)
Nord-Ostsee-Bahn, a German railway company
NOB, IATA code for Nosara Airport in Costa Rica 
Schweizerische Nord Ost Bahn (Swiss Northeastern Railway( (1853–1902), a former Swiss railway company
Narodno oslobodilačka borba ("National Liberation War"), name for World War II in Yugoslavia
 Nitrite-oxidizing bacteria, alternate term for nitrifying bacteria
Name on Back of team jerseys, see Name (sports)

See also
Nob (disambiguation)
Knob (disambiguation)